Michael A. Morin is an American politician and a Democratic member of the Rhode Island House of Representatives representing District 49 since March 4, 2014.

Education
Morin attended the Community College of Rhode Island.

Elections
2014 In the special election to replace Representative Lisa Baldelli-Hunt, Morin won the three-way January 21, 2014 Democratic Primary with 344 votes (52.3%) and won the February 25, 2014 General election with 233 votes (83.5%) against write-in candidates.
2012 Morin challenged District 3 incumbent Representative Baldelli-Hunt in the three-way September 11, 2012 Democratic Primary but lost to Representative Baldelli-Hunt, who went on to win re-election in the November 6, 2012 General election against Republican nominee Michael Moniz. Baldelli-Hunt won election to mayor of Woonsocket during the term, and resigned to take the position.

References

External links
Official page at the Rhode Island General Assembly

Michael Morin at Ballotpedia
Michael A. Morin at the National Institute on Money in State Politics

Place of birth missing (living people)
Year of birth uncertain
1960s births
Living people
American firefighters
Community College of Rhode Island alumni
Democratic Party members of the Rhode Island House of Representatives
People from Woonsocket, Rhode Island
21st-century American politicians